Events from the year 1682 in Sweden

Incumbents
 Monarch – Charles XI

Events

 The second Duellplakatet confirms the 1662 ban on duels with even more severity. 
 Absolute monarchy is established when the Estates acknowledge the right of the monarch to write laws without their participation. 
 The Great Reversion of the property of the nobility is placed entirely in the hands of the monarch.
 The theater company Dän Swänska Theatren is formed.
 The Allotment system reorganize the Swedish army system. 
 Lund University is reopened after the war.
   by Skogekär Bergbo.

Births

 17 June - Charles XII of Sweden, monarch (died 1718) 
 Margareta Capsia, painter  (died 1759) 
 Gustavus Hesselius, painter (died 1755)

Deaths

 - Elizabeth Carlsdotter Gyllenhielm, royal daughter and courtier  (born 1622)

References

 
Years of the 17th century in Sweden
Sweden